Beacon (NASDAQ: BECN) is an American publicly traded company which sells residential and non-residential roofing products, as well as related building products in North America. As of January 2, 2018, upon the completion of its acquisition of Allied Building Products, the company had 589 locations throughout all 50 states and six Canadian provinces, and over 8,500 employees. In addition to roofing, local divisions may also sell windows, siding, decking, waterproofing, and other external building products. The company is currently headquartered in Herndon, Virginia.

Company history 
Beacon was established in 1928 in Charlestown, Massachusetts, as Beacon Sales Company. By 1953, the company had outgrown its building in Charlestown, and built a new facility in nearby Somerville. In the 1970s, the company expanded to Worcester, Massachusetts, and Lewiston, Maine. In 1984, Andrew Logie bought a majority interest in the company. At that time, sales were almost $17 million, virtually all in commercial roofing. Shortly after Logie became CEO, David Grace joined Beacon as the company's chief financial officer. During Logie's tenure, the company opened new branches throughout the United States, and expanded into residential roofing as well as commercial roofing. By 1997, seven branches were generating $72 million in annual sales

In 1997, the equity firm Code, Hennessy & Simmons III, L.P. purchased a majority interest in the company. They re-branded it as Beacon Roofing Supply, Inc. In 1998, Beacon, in an attempt to acquire successful distributors, purchased its first regional brand, Quality Roofing Supply, a Pennsylvania based roofing distributor. From 1999 to 2000, Beacon continued its purchase of regional roofing distributors by acquiring Best Distributing (North Carolina), Groupe Bedard and Exeltherm Supply (Canada), The Roof Center (Maryland and Virginia), and West End Lumber (Texas).

By 2002, Beacon had surpassed $500 million in revenue. Early in fiscal 2004, Robert R. Buck joined the company and succeed Andrew Logie as president and CEO. To obtain money to grow the company, Beacon went public with an initial public offering on the NASDAQ stock exchange, on September 23, 2004. In 2005, The Wall Street Journal ranked Beacon as the sixth-fastest-growing new stock issue behind Google.

The company continued to acquire successful distributors across North America and drive organic growth in existing operations. Within three months of the IPO, Beacon acquired Atlanta-based JGA Corp., which had sales of $74 million. In October 2005, Beacon's made its largest acquisition by purchasing Shelter Distribution, a midwestern distributor with sales of $313 million and 50 branches. Other additions in 2005 and 2006 included Mississippi Roofing, Alabama Roofing, Pacific Supply, Minnesota’s Roof Depot, and RSM Supply in Arkansas, Missouri and Oklahoma.

Sales surpassed $850 million in fiscal 2005 and $1.5 billion in fiscal 2006. In April 2007, Beacon acquired North Coast Commercial Roofing Systems based in Twinsburg, Ohio, which had sales in excess of $250 million. This strategic acquisition moved Beacon into three new states—Ohio, New York and West Virginia. At this point, operations now encompassed 172 branches in 37 states and 3 Canadian provinces.

In October 2007, Beacon announced the appointment of Paul M. Isabella as president and chief operating officer.

At the end of 2010, Robert Buck relinquished the title of CEO to Paul Isabella while retaining the title of chairman of the board. Today, Buck remains actively involved with the investment community, acquisitions and monitoring organizational structure and leadership.

In fiscal 2011, Beacon increased sales by 12.9% to a record $1.82 billion. The company also expanded further into Canada with the acquisitions of Enercon Products in May, a Western Canada roofing distributor with six locations.

In fiscal 2012, the company exceeded $2 billion in sales for the first time. During 2012, the company also made several strategic acquisitions and opened several new branches which expanded its market coverage. In May 2012, the company acquired Pittsburgh, Philadelphia, headquartered Cassady Pierce, which was founded in 1947 and has six locations in and around the Western Pennsylvania area. A few weeks later, the company announced the opening of their 200th location in Myrtle Beach, South Carolina.

On July 1, 2012, Beacon acquired Southern California based Structural Materials Co. The acquisition more than doubled the size of the company's market penetration in the Southern California region.

Shortly after fiscal 2013 began, the company acquired McClure-Johnston Co. which expanded the company's footprint in the Pennsylvania region.

In 2014, Beacon again expanded its operations again by acquiring Wholesale Roofing Supply based out of Dallas, Texas, All Weather Products based out of Vancouver, and Applicators Sales & Service in New England.

In 2019, the transformative acquisition of Allied Building Products was completed and Beacon was named to the Fortune 500.

On August 16, 2019, Beacon Roofing Supply announced the establishment of the Beacon of Hope, a nationwide contest awarding deserving Veterans with new roofs.

On January 15, 2020, Beacon Roofing Supply updated its branding to Beacon Building Products reflecting its full product range of residential and commercial building products.

On December 21, 2020, Beacon Roofing Supply announced that it would sell its interior products business to American Securities, LLC for $850 million.

On February 19, 2021, Beacon Building Products announced the establishment of the Robert R. Buck Scholarship Program in honor of former president, CEO and chairman of the board, Robert “Bob” Buck.

On March 8, 2021, in honor of International Women's Day, Beacon Building Products announced the launch of its first annual North American Female Roofing Professional of the Year competition, shining a spotlight on women in the roofing industry across the U.S. and Canada.

On November 1, 2021, Beacon acquired Midway Sales & Distributing, Inc. (“Midway Wholesale” or “Midway”). With 10 locations across Kansas, Missouri and Nebraska, this acquisition deepens Beacon's presence in the Midwest.

On December 1, 2021, Beacon announced the completion of the sale of its solar products (“Solar Products”) business to BayWa r.e., a leading renewable energy developer, service supplier and systems provider globally and in the Americas.

On December 31, 2021, Beacon Announces Acquisition of Crabtree Siding and Supply, a wholesale distributor of residential exterior building materials, including a broad offering of complementary products, to contractors and homebuilder customers.

Executive profiles 
Julian G. Francis, president and chief executive officer, effective September 1, 2019.

References

External links 

Companies listed on the Nasdaq
Building materials companies of the United States
Business services companies established in 1928
Retail companies established in 1928
Companies based in Fairfax County, Virginia
Companies based in Virginia
1928 establishments in Massachusetts